Battle of Belkot was fought in Belkot fort in 1744 a few days after the Battle of Nuwakot, part of the Unification of Nepal. It resulted in a Gorkhali victory, and the commander Jayant Rana was captured and flayed alive after ordering to be skinned alive by Prithvi Narayan Shah, first King of Nepal.

References 

Battles of the Unification of Nepal
Gurkhas
Conflicts in 1744
History of Nepal
1744 in Nepal
B